Robert Cutting may refer to:

 Robert L. Cutting Jr. (1836–1894), American banker and clubman
 Robert L. Cutting (1812–1887), American businessman
 Robert Fulton Cutting (1852–1934), American financier and philanthropist
 Robert Bayard Cutting (1875–1918), American soldier